Govindapuram is a village in Pusapatirega mandal of Vizianagaram district in Andhra Pradesh, India.

See also
Govindapuram in Kozhikode District 
Govindapuram in Palakkad district

Villages in Vizianagaram district
Uttarandhra